The Mounted Band of the Household Cavalry is a British Army band which ceremonially serves the Household Cavalry Mounted Regiment (HCMR). The HCMR Band is the largest symphonic wind band in the British Army. It is one of the bands of the Royal Corps of Army Music (RCAM) and is currently based at Hyde Park Barracks and Combermere Barracks.

Origins

Band of The Life Guards
In the years since the dissolution of the Commonwealth of England, music had become very important to the ceremonial duties of the regiment, which each Troop of the Guards having a fanfare team consisting of one kettledrummer and four trumpeters. The trumpets and drums were silver, crimson, and gold, with the Royal Coat of Arms engraved on it. At that time, the horses they mounted were of a black Clydesdale horses.

Band of The Blues and Royals
It originates from the Band of the Royal Horse Guards which was founded in 1805. On St George's Day that year, King George III presented the band with a set of silver kettledrums, and appointed Herr Stowasser as the first bandmaster of the Regiment.  In 1938, the band made an appeared in the movie The Drum where they performed in kilts for the first time in their history. The band went through an amalgamation in 1969 to form the Band of the Blues and Royals which was founded in the same year.

Merger
In September 2014, the Bands of The Life Guards and the Blues and Royals were merged to form the combined Mounted Band of the Household Cavalry composed of 64 musicians from the two bands. The band wear the uniform of both The Life Guards and the Blues and Royals on service events and the State Dress on major holidays and occasions.

Regimental music
 Life Guards: 
 Quick - Millanollo
 Slow - Life Guards Slow March
 Trot Past - Keel Row
 Blues and Royals: 
 Quick - Quick March of the Blues and Royals
 Slow - Slow March of the Blues and Royals
 Trot Past - Keel Row

Events 

The two 35 member mounted bands of the combined massed bands of the HCMR Band regularly perform at special occasions and events. Some of the main and most notable events they participate in are listed below, although this is not a comprehensive list:

 Mounting of the King's Life Guard
 State and official visits to the United Kingdom
 The Festival of Remembrance
 Trooping the Colour
 Beating Retreat
 State Procession at the State Opening of Parliament
 Lord Mayor's Show
 Coronation of the British monarch

Since 2014, the HCMR Band has performed in many other public events, such as the Sweden International Tattoo, as well as the Birmingham International Tattoo.

Uniform 
The HCMR Band mostly wears 3 ceremonial dress uniforms:

 The mounted band's main uniform is known as the state dress (unchanged since 1685) which consists of a gold state uniform and dark blue peaked equestrian caps. The state dress is only worn if a member of the British royal family is present, as for example on the Monarch's Birthday Parade (Trooping the Colour), but not on the two Trooping the Colour's rehearsals, the Major General's Review and the Colonel's Review. An often overlooked detail on the state dress is a pair of vestigial false sleeves, now in form of narrow strips hanging from the back of the shoulder and looped up into the waist-belt. False sleeves were a traditional embellishment of the uniforms of British Army drummers and pipers (who were also, in non-royal regiments, clad in reverse colours) which were abolished in 1768.
 The main uniform of the Life Guards consists of a scarlet coat with a silver lace. It originates from a similar uniform created in 1678.
 On ceremonial occasions, the Blues and Royals wear a blue tunic (inherited from the Royal Horse Guards, also known as "the Blues"), with an Eagle arm patch inherited from the 1st The Royal Dragoons, and a metal cuirass, and a matching helmet with a red plume worn unbound.

State Trumpeters and Drummers
The HCMR Band often provides State Trumpeters for ceremonial events of state. The HCMR Band, specifically when denoted as the "Massed Mounted Bands" on parade, is led by two musicians on Shire horses who are playing the timpani. They steer the reins of the drum horses with their feet, due to their hands being occupied with the drumsticks. A drum horse must have a minimum of 68 inches in order to be used in this regard. They also have to have the capability to carry two silver drums weighing  combined.

Notable members

 Major Jason Griffiths - Director of the Band of the Blues and Royals
 Captain J. Cooper - Member of the Band of the Life Guards and founder of the Nigerian Army Band Corps
 Warrant Officer Class 1 Esther Freeborn - First female bandmaster of the HCMR Band
 Herr Stowasser - First Bandmaster of the Band of the Blues and Royals
 James Tutton - Bandmaster of the Band of the Blues and Royals and one of the founders of the Society of British Musicians
 Richard Jones - Magician and soldier known for winning the tenth series of Britain's Got Talent in 2016.

See also
Mounted band
Military band
Household Cavalry Mounted Regiment
Bands of the Household Division

Citations

External links
IMMS-UK: Household Cavalry Mounted Band - June 2016
Household Cavalry Mounted Band drummer
The Band of the Household Cavalry and The Life Guards
Changing of The Queen's Guard - 7 June 2015 - FEAT Band of the Household Cavalry
Garter Parade 2015 with the Household Cavalry Band

Royal Corps of Army Music
Mounted bands
Household Cavalry
British ceremonial units